
Gmina Rawicz is an urban-rural gmina (administrative district) in Rawicz County, Greater Poland Voivodeship, in west-central Poland.

Villages
Apart from the town of Rawicz, Gmina Rawicz contains the villages and settlements of Dąbrówka, Dębno Polskie, Folwark, Izbice, Kąty, Konarzewo, Krasnolipka, Krystynki, Łąkta, Łaszczyn, Masłowo, Masłowo-Warszewo, Sarnówka, Sierakowo, Sikorzyn, Słupia Kapitulna, Stwolno, Szymanowo, Ugoda, Wydawy, Załęcze, Zawady, Zielona Wieś, Żołędnica and Żylice.

Neighbouring gminas
Gmina Rawicz is bordered by the gminas of Bojanowo, Miejska Górka, Milicz, Pakosław, Wąsosz and Żmigród.

References
Polish official population figures 2006

Rawicz
Rawicz County